The kudus are two species of antelope of the genus Tragelaphus:

 Lesser kudu, Tragelaphus imberbis, of eastern Africa
 Greater kudu, Tragelaphus strepsiceros, of eastern and southern Africa
The two species look similar, though greaters are larger than lessers. Males of both species have long horns, which point upward and slightly back, curling in a corkscrew shape.

Etymology
The name of the animal was imported into English in the 18th century from isiXhosa iqhude, via Afrikaans koedoe.

Kudu, or koodoo, is the Khoikhoi and seTswana name for this antelope. Tragos (Greek) denotes a he-goat and elaphos (Greek) a deer. Strepho (Greek) means "I twist", and strephis is "twisting". Keras (Greek) means "horn".

Habitat
Lesser kudus occupy savanna near Acacia and Commiphora shrubs. They rely on thickets for protection, so they are rarely seen in the open. Their brown and striped pelts help to camouflage them in scrub environments.

Behavior 

As in many other antelopes, male kudus can be found in bachelor groups, but they are more likely to be solitary. Their dominance displays tend not to last long and are generally fairly peaceful, consisting of one male making himself look big by making his hair stand on end. When males do have a face-off, they will lock their horns in a competition to determine the stronger puller; kudus' necks enlarge during the mating season for this reason. Sometimes two competing males are unable to unlock their horns and, if unable to disengage, will die of starvation or dehydration. Males are seen with females only in the mating season, when they join in groups of 5–15 kudus, including offspring. Calves grow quickly and at six months are largely independent of their mothers.

A pregnant female will leave the herd to give birth to a single offspring. She will leave the newborn lying hidden for 4–5 weeks while coming back only to nurse it, which is the longest nursing period of any antelope species. Then the calf will start accompanying its mother for short periods. At 3 or 4 months, the calf will be with its mother constantly, and at about six months they will rejoin the group.

When threatened, kudu will often run away rather than fight. Wounded bulls have been known to charge an attacker, hitting the attacker with their sturdy horn base rather than stabbing it. Wounded females can keep running for many miles without stopping to rest for more than a minute. They have a powerful kick and are capable of breaking a wild dog's or jackal's neck or back. They are good jumpers and can clear a 5-foot fence from a standing start.

Diet
Kudus are browsers and eat leaves and shoots. In dry seasons they eat wild watermelons and other fruit for their liquid content and natural sugars. The lesser kudu is less dependent on water sources than the greater kudu.

Predators and threats
Predators, such as lions, leopards, cheetahs, wild dogs, hyenas, crocodiles and sometimes pythons, hunt adult kudu or their young. Kudu numbers are also affected by humans hunting them for their meat, hides and horns, or using their habitats for charcoal burning and farming.

Kudus were highly susceptible to the rinderpest virus (now eradicated after a vaccination program in domestic cattle), and many scientists believe that, in earlier times, recurring epidemics of the disease reduced kudu populations in East Africa.

Kudus are susceptible to rabies in times of extended drought. They have been known to enter farm houses and other buildings when infected. Infected animals appear tame and have a distinct frothing at the mouth. Rabid kudu are fearless, and bulls may sometimes attack humans who get too close.

Meat
Kudu meat is similar to venison (deer), with a slight gamey, liver-like flavor. It is a very dry and lean meat, so it needs to be cooked carefully to avoid drying it out.
Kudu meat is reckoned to produce the best biltong, air-dried meat that accompanies a sundowner on the khonde.

In music and culture

A kudu horn is a musical instrument made from the horn of the kudu. A form of it is sometimes used as a shofar in Jewish ceremonies. It is seen in the Western world in its use as a part of the Scouting movement's Wood Badge training program; the sounding of the horn signals the start of a Wood Badge training course or activity. A horn of this shape, when used by football fans, is called kuduzela (a portmanteau of "kudu" and "vuvuzela"). 

The kudu, "tholo" in the languages of Sepedi, Setswana and Venda, is a tribal totem of the Barolong and Batlhaping people of Botswana and South Africa.

In the sport of kudu dung-spitting, contestants spit pellets of kudu dung, with the farthest distance (including the roll) reached being the winner. The sport is mostly popular among the Afrikaner community in South Africa, and a world championship is held each year.

See also 

 Greater kudu
 Lesser kudu
 Pudu, an unrelated small deer

References

External links

 Kudu: Wildlife summary from the African Wildlife Foundation

Mammals of Africa
Scouting